Rose Hill is an unincorporated community in Warren County, Mississippi, United States.

Notes

Unincorporated communities in Warren County, Mississippi
Unincorporated communities in Mississippi